Gábor Neu (born 19 May 1981) is a Hungarian judoka.

Achievements

References
 

1981 births
Living people
Hungarian male judoka
Universiade medalists in judo
Universiade bronze medalists for Hungary
Medalists at the 2003 Summer Universiade
21st-century Hungarian people